Eco Everest Expedition is an annual expedition drill, started by Asian Trekking Pvt. Ltd. in 2008, with the sole aim of clearing and removing accumulated debris on Mount Everest.

Background
Mount Everest, the highest mountain on earth, has attracted thousands of mountaineers in the last two centuries and was first successfully climbed in 1953 by Edmund Hillary and Tenzing Norgay. Hundreds of expeditions left garbage and mountaineering equipment by the ascent lines. Some items at high altitude remained there for decades and gradually piled up. Garbage became a threat to the environment and future expeditions.

Cleaning the debris

2008 expedition 
Asian Trekking - Eco Everest Expedition began removing debris in 2008. Partnering with the International Centre for Integrated Mountain Development and United Nations Environment Programme and support by Nepal, the expedition created awareness about global warming and importance of sustainable mountaineering. Dawa Stevan Sherpa, son of well known mountaineer Ang Thsering Sherpa led the first expedition and reached the summit on 26 May 2008.

See also
List of Mount Everest expeditions

References

2008
China–Nepal border
Environment of Nepal
2008 establishments in Nepal